Ashok Singh may refer to:

Ashok Singh (politician) (born 1955), member of the Lok Sabha, the lower house of the Parliament of India (1996–1997, 1998–1999)
Ashok Singh (footballer, born 1989), Indian football goalkeeper
Ashok Singh (footballer, born 1993), Indian football defender
Ashok Veer Vikram Singh (1949–2014), member of the Madhya Pradesh Legislative Assembly
Ashok Kumar (field hockey) (Ashok Kumar Singh, born 1950), Indian field hockey player